Paul Frankeur (29 June 1905 - 27 October 1974) was a French actor who appeared in films by Jacques Tati (Jour de fête) and Luis Buñuel (The Discreet Charm of the Bourgeoisie and The Phantom of Liberty).  He was sometimes credited as Paul Francoeur.

Selected filmography

 Nous les gosses (1941) - Le secrétaire du commissaire (uncredited)
 Croisières sidérales (1942) - Le premier bonimenteur
 Fantastic Night (1942) - Le patron du bistrot
 Le mariage de Chiffon (1942) - Le mécanicien de Max
 Une étoile au soleil (1943)
 Le voyageur de la Toussaint (1943) - (uncredited)
 Madame et le mort (1943)
 Goodbye Leonard (1943) - Edouuard - le cordonnier (uncredited)
 Night Shift (1944) - Un réparateur de ligne
 Children of Paradise (1945) - L'inspecteur de police
 A Cage of Nightingales (1945) - (uncredited)
 Girl with Grey Eyes (1945)
 Star Without Light (1946) - Le reporter
 Devil's Daughter (1946) - L'aubergiste / The bartender
 Messieurs Ludovic (1946) - M. Seguin (uncredited)
 The Ideal Couple (1946) - Le coiffeur
 Mr. Orchid (1946) - Simon
 Counter Investigation (1947) - Teddy Coffre-Fort
 Les Amants du pont Saint-Jean (1947) - Georges Girard
 The Bouquinquant Brothers (1947)- Le commissaire
 Les Casse Pieds (1948) - Le blagueur
 The Mark of the Day (1949) - Bac
 Jour de fête (1949) - Marcel
 Return to Life (1949) - Le maire (segment 5 : Le retour de Louis")
 Histoires extraordinaires à faire peur ou à faire rire... (1949) - Dugelay
 Monseigneur (1949) - Le forain
 Au p'tit zouave (1950) - L'inspecteur-chef
 Justice Is Done (1950) - Monsieur Jouvillon (uncredited)
 The Winner's Circle (1950) - Victor
 Under the Sky of Paris (1951) - Milou
 Passion (1951) - Jacques Charbonnier
 The Smugglers' Banquet (1952) - Auguste Demeuse
 We Are All Murderers (1952) - Léon
 Follow That Man (1953) - M. Mallet
 Endless Horizons (1953) - Soupape
 Jeunes mariés (1953) - Le brigadier de gendarmerie
 Thérèse Raquin (1953) - Le contrôleur
 L'Étrange Désir de monsieur Bard (1954) - Le curé
 Before the Deluge (1954) - Monsieur Boussard
 Touchez pas au grisbi (1954) - Pierrot
 Huis clos (1954) - Gomez - le compagnon de Garcin
 Le petit nuage/La chasse au nuage/Le nuage atomique (1954) - Regisseur
 The Price of Love (1955) - Commissaire Bernard
 Razzia sur la chnouf (1955) - Fernand, le commissaire
 Le crâneur (1955) - Georges
 Black Dossier (1955) - Charles Broussard
 Nana (1955) - Bordenave
 Je suis un sentimental (1955) - Jacques Rupert
 People of No Importance (1956) - Émile Barchandeau
 Les Assassins du dimanche (1956) - Lucien Simonet
 Blood to the Head (1956) - Drouin
 Reproduction interdite (1957) - Marc Kelber
 Le rouge est mis (1957) - Fredo
 An Eye for an Eye (1957) - L'opéré
 Les Copains du dimanche (1958) - Monsieur Larcheron - le directeur de l'usine
 Le désordre et la nuit (1958) - Inspecteur Chaville
 A Bullet in the Gun Barrel (1958) - Pépère
 The Tiger Attacks (1959) - Raymond Maroux
 Marie-Octobre (1959) - Lucien Marinval - mandataire aux Halles
 Archimède le clochard (1959) - M. Grégoire, le premier patron du café
 Minute papillon (1959) - Moraga
 Maigret et l'Affaire Saint-Fiacre (1959) - Le docteur Bouchardon
 Rue des prairies (1959) - Ernest l'ami d'Henri
 Come Dance with Me (1959) - Le commissaire / Inspector Marchal
 Quai du Point-du-Jour (1960) - Monsieur Pierre
 Le panier à crabes (1960) - Clavier
 The Lovemakers (1961) - Ferdinando
 Jugez-les bien (1961) - Cassel
 Un singe en hiver (1962) - Esnault
 The Gentleman from Epsom (1962) - Arthur
 The Trip to Biarritz (1963) - Le chauffeur de la locomotive (uncredited)
 Maigret Sees Red (1963) - Bonfils
 Le commissaire mène l'enquête (1963) - Inspecteur Reboux
 Nick Carter va tout casser (1964) - Antonio
 La corde au cou (1965) - L'inspecteur Bruneau
 God's Thunder (1965) - Le gendarme (uncredited)
 La Longue marche (1966) - Morel
 The Mona Lisa Has Been Stolen (1966) - Lemercier, l'encadreur
 Le deuxième souffle (1966) - Inspector Fardiano
 Leontine (1968) - Ruffin
 The Milky Way (1969) - Pierre
 Mon oncle Benjamin (1969) - Le docteur Minxit
 The Discreet Charm of the Bourgeoisie (1972) - François Thévenot
 Poil de carotte (1973) - Le parrin / Godfather
 The Phantom of Liberty (1974) - L'aubergiste / Innkeeper
 Le cri du coeur (1974) - Jean
 Dédé la tendresse (1974)
 Un tueur, un flic, ainsi soit-il... (1977) - Dutour (final film role)

External links

1905 births
1974 deaths
French male film actors
20th-century French male actors